Enrique Roberto Cuellar (born September 19, 1955) is an American attorney and politician serving as the U.S. representative for  since 2005. A member of the Democratic Party, he is considered one of the most conservative representatives in the Democratic caucus. His district extends from the Rio Grande to San Antonio's suburbs. , he was also the last Democrat to have held a statewide office in Texas.

Cuellar served 14 years in the Texas House of Representatives before a brief stint as Texas secretary of state in 2001. He was first elected to Congress in 2004, after defeating the more liberal 28th district incumbent, Ciro Rodriguez, in the primary, and after a failed run for Congress in the neighboring 23rd district in 2002. Cuellar has survived multiple competitive primary races in recent years, most notably in 2020 and 2022.

Early life and education
Cuellar was born in Laredo, the county seat of Webb County in South Texas, where he has resided most of his life. His Mexican-American parents, Martin Siller Cuellar Sr. (1926–2019), and the former Odilia Perez (1928–2015), a native of Zapata, Texas, traveled as far north as Idaho each year doing migrant labor until Martin found work as a gardener and ranch manager. With eight children, the Cuellar family lived on Reynolds Street in the Las Lomas neighborhood of "The Heights" area of Laredo. His parents knew no English. They instilled a strong work ethic in their children.

Cuellar is the oldest of his parents' children. His brother, Martin Jr., is the sheriff of Webb County, first elected in 2008 over the incumbent, Rick Flores. A sister, Rosie Cuellar-Castillo, is the Laredo municipal judge, having won a nonpartisan runoff election on December 11, 2010.

Cuellar attended Buenos Aires Elementary School, where he became an avid reader and graduated in 1973 from J. W. Nixon High School. He received an associate of arts degree from Laredo Community College, then known as Laredo Junior College, where he later taught courses in government. He then attended the Walsh School of Foreign Service at Georgetown University and graduated cum laude with a Bachelor of Science in foreign service. He also earned a Master of Arts in international trade from Texas A&M International University, a juris doctor from the University of Texas School of Law and a PhD from the University of Texas at Austin.

Early career
Cuellar opened his own law firm in Laredo in 1981, and became a licensed customs broker in 1983. From 1984 to 1986 he taught at Texas A&M International University as an adjunct professor of international commercial law.

Texas House of Representatives
Cuellar was a member of the Texas House of Representatives from 1987 to 2001, representing most of Laredo. During his 14 years as a state representative, he served in leadership positions on the House Appropriations, Higher Education, and Calendar committees. He also served on several national legislative committees dealing with state budgets, the U.S.–Mexico border and international trade.

Texas Secretary of State
In 2001, Governor Rick Perry appointed Cuellar to be secretary of state of Texas. He served in the office for just over nine months until his resignation, after which Geoff Connor held the position in an acting capacity. , Cuellar is the last Democrat to have served in the role.

U.S. House of Representatives

Elections

2002

In 2002, Cuellar was the Democratic nominee for the House of Representatives in Texas's 23rd congressional district. He lost to five-term incumbent Republican Henry Bonilla 52%–47% in the closest race Bonilla had faced to that date. Bonilla was unseated in 2006 in the revised 23rd district by Democrat Ciro Rodriguez.

2004

Cuellar spent much of early 2003 preparing for a rematch against Bonilla. The 2003 Texas redistricting, however, shifted most of Laredo, which had been the heart of the 23rd since its creation in 1966, into the 28th district, represented by Rodriguez. Cuellar challenged Rodriguez, a former friend, for the nomination and won it by 58 votes. The Washington Post described the campaign as "nasty ... with Cuellar claiming Rodriguez was an AWOL congressman, while Rodriguez called Cuellar a political opportunist". The initial count gave Rodriguez a 145-vote lead, but after a recount Cuellar led by 58 votes. "Rodriguez filed a lawsuit questioning the eligibility of hundreds of votes. A state appeals court ruling against Rodriguez guaranteed Cuellar the nomination." Cuellar's victory was one of only two primary upsets of incumbents from either party in the entire country.

The 28th district leans far more Democratic than the 23rd, and Cuellar's victory in the general election was a foregone conclusion. In November, he defeated Republican Jim Hopson of Seguin by a 20-point margin, becoming the first Laredoan in over 20 years elected to represent the 28th district. Cuellar's election to the House in 2004 was a standout for Democrats in a year in which Republicans otherwise gained seats in Texas's House delegation.

2006

On March 7, 2006, Cuellar again defeated Rodriguez in the Democratic primary with 52% of the vote in a three-way race. No Republican filed, ostensibly assuring him of reelection in November.

On June 29, the U.S. Supreme Court declared that the Texas legislature had violated Latino voters' rights when it shifted most of Laredo out of the 23rd and replaced it with several heavily Republican San Antonio suburbs. As a result, nearly every congressional district from El Paso to San Antonio had to be redrawn, and the primary results for these districts were invalidated. A court drew a new map in which all of Laredo was moved into the 28th district while the south San Antonio area was moved to the 23rd. An election open to all candidates with a runoff if no candidate won 50% was scheduled for the date of the general election, November 7, 2006.

In the general election on November 7, 2006, Cuellar had no Republican opposition but handily defeated Ron Avery of McQueeney, the chairman of the conservative Constitution Party in Guadalupe County, and trial attorney and Democrat Frank Enriquez of McAllen, with nearly 68% of the vote.

Cuellar's two main political rivals, Bonilla and Rodriguez, ran against each other in the 23rd, and Rodriguez won the election in the runoff. Bonilla was hence out of Congress for the first time since his upset election in 1992.

2008

Cuellar was unopposed in the March 4, 2008, Democratic primary.

In the November 4 general election, Cuellar easily defeated Republican James Taylor Fish. Jim Fish, as he is known, was a health-care administrator for 17 years while serving in the United States Air Force. He also taught finance at the Army-Baylor University Graduate School of Health Care Administration. An ordained Southern Baptist deacon, Fish opposed same-sex marriage. He said he had decided to oppose Cuellar after watching Cuellar's exchange with Sheriff Rick Flores over border security issues on a 2007 broadcast of the Glenn Beck television program, then on CNN.

Cuellar received 123,310 votes (69%) to Fish's 52,394 (29%) and 3,715 (2%) for Libertarian Ross Lynn Leone. In Webb County, Cuellar polled 41,567 votes (90%) to Fish's 4,089 (9%).

2010

Cuellar was unopposed for the Democratic nomination in 2010. Motivated by Cuellar's votes on cap and trade and the Patient Protection and Affordable Care Act, two Republicans, Daniel Chavez, a utility company employee from Mission in Hidalgo County, and Bryan Keith Underwood, a carpenter from Seguin in Guadalupe County, filed for their party's nomination. Underwood polled 13,599 votes (74%) to Chavez's 4,794 (26%).

Underwood raised more funds than Cuellar's previous Republican opponents, but questions were raised in his hometown newspaper, the Seguin Gazette, about his criminal record, which included a guilty plea for a felony criminal mischief charge, which is normally a misdemeanor. Underwood had also refused on one occasion to present his identification to a law enforcement officer.

Cuellar prevailed, as expected, with 62,055 votes (56%) to Underwood's 46,417 (42%). The remaining 1,880 votes (2%) went to Libertarian Party candidate Stephen Kaat. While Underwood won Guadalupe, Wilson, McMullen, and Atascosa counties, Cuellar's margin in Webb County (25,415 to 3,569) was more than enough assure him a seat in the incoming Republican-majority House.

2012

Cuellar was opposed in the November 6 general election by Republican William R. Hayward and Libertarian Patrick Hisel. Hisel ran unsuccessfully as a Libertarian in 2010 against Republican U.S. Representative Kay Granger from the Tarrant County-based 12th district.

Guadalupe County, a Republican stronghold that usually opposed Cuellar for reelection, was removed from the reconfigured 28th district.

Cuellar defeated Hayward, 112,262 (68%) to 49,095 (30%). Hisel took 2% of the vote, and a Green Party candidate received the remaining 1%.

2014

Cuellar faced no Republican opposition in 2014. Then Webb County Republican chairman Randall Scott "Randy" Blair of Laredo criticized Cuellar's 2010 vote for Obamacare but said the GOP could not find a candidate because of Cuellar's personal popularity, political longevity, occasional cooperation with Republicans, and strong campaign organization.

2016

Cuellar won a rematch in the March 1, 2016, Democratic primary with former Republican congressional candidate William R. Hayward, who switched parties to run again for the House. Cuellar received 49,962 votes (89.8%) to Hayward's 5,682 (10.2%). Cuellar then defeated Republican Zeffen Patrick Hardin in the November 8 general election, 122,086 (66.2%) to 57,740 (31.3%). Green Party nominee Michael D. Cary received 4,616 votes (2.5%).

2018

In the general election held on November 6, 2018, Cuellar overwhelmed his lone challenger, Libertarian Arthur Thomas, IV, 117,178 votes (84.4%) to 21,647 (15.6%).

2020

On January 11, 2019, the progressive organization Justice Democrats, which supported U.S. Representative Alexandria Ocasio-Cortez's successful 2018 primary campaign in New York City, announced that it was seeking a primary challenger against Cuellar in the Democratic primary scheduled for March 4, 2020. On July 13, 2019, the Justice Democrats organization announced its support for Jessica Cisneros, a 26-year-old immigration and human rights attorney from Laredo who had announced a primary campaign against Cuellar. Cuellar defeated Cisneros 51.8% to 48.2% and was reelected in November.

2022

Cuellar finished first with a plurality in the Democratic primary, tallying 23,552 votes, 48.4%, over Cisneros, who received 22,745, 46.9%, to qualify for the May runoff. Tannya Benavides was eliminated, getting 2,289 votes, or 4.7%.

During the runoff, Cuellar faced renewed scrutiny over an incident in 2018 where he fired a pregnant staffer who had requested parental leave and subsequently suffered a miscarriage, and according to court documents, subsequently urged other staffers to help him discredit her.

On June 7, Cisneros, 281 votes behind in the runoff, requested a recount to be conducted by the Texas Democratic Party. Cuellar gained votes during the recount, yielding a 289-vote margin. The Associated Press called the race on June 21, 2022.

On November 8, Cuellar easily won reelection after defeating Republican Cassy Garica.

Committee assignments
 Committee on Appropriations
 Subcommittee on Homeland Security
 Subcommittee on State, Foreign Operations, and Related Programs
 Committee on Homeland Security
 Subcommittee on Border and Maritime Security (Ranking Member)
 Subcommittee on Counterterrorism and Intelligence

Caucus memberships
 Afterschool Caucuses
 Congressional Hispanic Caucus
 Blue Dog Coalition
 United States Congressional International Conservation Caucus (Co-Chair)
U.S.-Japan Caucus
New Democrat Coalition

Political positions 

Cuellar has described himself as a "moderate-centrist" or conservative Democrat. During the 117th Congress, he voted with the Democratic caucus 96.8% of the time. He voted with the Democratic majority 87.9% of the time during President Trump's tenure, while voting with Trump's stance 40.6% of the time. Cuellar was ranked the fifth-most bipartisan member of the House of Representatives in the first session of the 115th United States Congress by the Lugar Center and McCourt School of Public Policy. He is one of two Blue Dog Democrats in Texas's congressional delegation.

As of September 2022, Cuellar had voted in line with Joe Biden's stated position 94.3% of the time.

Immigration

In 2011, Cuellar was the author and one of two main co-sponsors of legislation seeking to honor slain ICE agent Jaime Zapata. Billed as a border security bill, it would increase cooperation among state, local, and federal law enforcement agencies during investigations of human and drug smuggling from Mexico.

In 2013, in a statement with House colleagues Beto O'Rourke and Filemon Vela Jr., Cuellar renewed his opposition to a border fence along the Rio Grande between the U.S. and Mexico. He denounced inclusion in the Senate immigration bill of an amendment sponsored by Senators Bob Corker and John Hoeven that called for 700 additional miles of border fencing, calling the fence an antiquated solution to a modern problem. The fence, he said, ignores the economic ties between the two nations, which reached $500 billion in 2012.

In 2014, Cuellar was the only House Democrat to vote for a bill that would have made deporting unaccompanied minors to Central America easier. He also released unauthorized photographs of unsanitary conditions in Border Patrol detention centers. Despite these actions, Cuellar said he firmly supports "comprehensive immigration reform".

In May 2015, Cuellar called for 55 more federal judges to handle the overload of 450,000 immigration cases. There were 260 such judges in 58 courts. Twenty-eight of them serve Texas; no immigration judge holds court in Laredo. Many of those awaiting hearings are held in detention centers or released on bond. In many cases, those on bond never come to their scheduled hearings. Cuellar said South Texas and Laredo have particular need for judges.

On July 23, 2015, the occasion of Donald Trump's presidential campaign visit to Laredo, Cuellar said that Trump had "overgeneralized and exacerbated a rhetoric of immigrant crime that has offended many, particularly those of Mexican heritage". Cuellar added that Trump's meeting with border officials provided an opportunity for him to view Laredo as a "culturally rich and safe border community". In April 2017, Cuellar issued a statement accusing Trump of "threatening to shut down the government if he doesn't get to build his symbolic border wall. He wants to cut things like education, transportation, and health care, to fund his pet project. Now that he is facing bipartisan opposition to this irresponsible plan, he wants to punish the American people by shutting down the government."

Cuellar was one of three Democrats to vote for Kate's Law, which expands maximum sentences for immigrants who reenter the U.S. after being deported. He supported legislation to strip federal funding for jurisdictions that have sanctuary policies in place.

Other issues
On June 15, 2007, Cuellar announced that he was endorsing then U.S. Senator Hillary Clinton for president in 2008, saying, "Senator Clinton is the only candidate with the experience and toughness to hit the ground running on her first day in the White House." In 2007, he held a fundraiser for Clinton in Laredo that raised over $200,000 and was attended by former President Bill Clinton. Laredo Mayor Raul G. Salinas joined Cuellar in giving his early support to Hillary Clinton, who came to Laredo in October 2008 to endorse Cuellar's reelection to the House. On November 4, 2008, Barack Obama defeated Republican John McCain in Webb County with 71% of the vote to McCain's 28%.

Cuellar rejected the first House bailout bill, which was voted down, but backed the final version that passed in the fall of 2008. He was also one of 27 Democrats to oppose the House financial regulatory reform bill, a top priority for Obama.

On June 26, 2009, Cuellar voted with the House majority to pass the American Clean Energy and Security Act, also known as the cap and trade bill. He also supported the Affordable Health Care for America Act, which narrowly passed the House and in December 2009 met the threshold for shutting off debate in the U.S. Senate by a single vote.

Cuellar opposes abortion. He expressed concerns that the Senate health care bill allowed federal funding for abortion. He has voted for a ban on abortion after week 20. On March 21, 2010, Cuellar voted for the Patient Protection and Affordable Care Act, which passed the House by a vote of 219–212. In 2021, he was the only Democrat to vote against the Women's Health Protection Act, which aims to preserve access to abortion nationwide. The Act was proposed in response to the Texas Heartbeat Act which bans abortion after 6 weeks in Texas.

On December 18, 2019, Cuellar voted for both articles of impeachment against Trump.

Cuellar's boosting of automated license plate recognition federal contractor Perceptics LLC was published in February 2020, showing lobbying by Podesta Group since 2009. Cuellar used talking points related to Perceptics contracts. He was called "our Cuellar firepower" and Perceptics CEO John Dalton called him a "friendly congressman" for Perceptics.

In 2020, Cuellar was one of six House Democrats to vote against the Marijuana Opportunity Reinvestment and Expungement (MORE) Act to legalize cannabis at the federal level. In 2014, he was the lone Democrat on the House Appropriations Committee to vote for a measure blocking the implementation of a Washington, D.C., decriminalization law. Cuellar has also repeatedly voted against the Rohrabacher–Farr amendment, legislation that limits the enforcement of federal law in states that have legalized medical cannabis.

In February 2020, Cuellar was one of seven House Democrats to vote against the Protecting the Right to Organize (PRO) Act that would overhaul labor laws. In March 2021, he was the only Democrat to vote against it.

In August 2021, Cuellar joined a group of conservative Democrats, dubbed "The Unbreakable Nine", who threatened to derail the Biden administration's $3.5 trillion budget reconciliation package meant to address the nation's physical infrastructure and social safety net.

On July 29, 2022, Cuellar and four other Democrats joined the Republicans in voting against a bill banning assault weapons.

Personal life
Cuellar and his wife, Imelda, have two daughters. In 2014, Cuellar portrayed George Washington in the annual Washington's Birthday Celebration in Laredo.

Cuellar is Roman Catholic.

FBI investigation 
On January 19, 2022, the FBI raided Cuellar's Laredo residence and campaign office and removed several items, including cases and at least one computer, as part of a federal probe relating to Azerbaijan, a country that has been criticized for its caviar diplomacy. On January 21, 2022, a federal grand jury issued subpoenas for records related to Cuellar, his wife, and at least one campaign staffer concerning "anything of value" that they may have been offered by certain business leaders or foreign officials and any "work, act, favor, or service" that they may have provided at the behest of certain foreign government officials, businesses, or others. Cuellar has taken particular interest in Azerbaijan and co-chairs the Congressional Azerbaijan Caucus. Although Cuellar's lawyer has maintained that Cuellar is innocent and is not a target of the investigation, the FBI has made no statement on the point.

See also 
 List of Hispanic and Latino Americans in the United States Congress

Notes

References

External links 

 Congressman Henry Cuellar official U.S. House website
 Henry Cuellar for Congress
 
 

|-

|-

|-

|-

|-

1955 births
20th-century American lawyers
20th-century American politicians
21st-century American politicians
Activists for Hispanic and Latino American civil rights
Activists from Texas
American politicians of Mexican descent
Catholics from Texas
Catholic politicians from Texas
Customs brokers
Democratic Party members of the United States House of Representatives from Texas
Hispanic and Latino American members of the United States Congress
Hispanic and Latino American state legislators in Texas
J. W. Nixon High School alumni
Laredo Community College alumni
Living people
Democratic Party members of the Texas House of Representatives
People from Laredo, Texas
Secretaries of State of Texas
Texas A&M International University faculty
Texas lawyers
University of Texas School of Law alumni
Walsh School of Foreign Service alumni